William Anthony Worthington (born 11 October 1941), known as Tony Worthington, is a retired politician in the United Kingdom.

Early life
He was brought up in Lincoln, attending the City School (a boys' grammar school) on Monks Road in Lincoln. He gained a BA in Sociology and Social Policy from the London School of Economics and a MEd from the University of Glasgow. From the University of York, he gained a PGCE, and then an Advanced PGCE from Durham University.

From 1962 to 1966 he was a lecturer in Social Policy and Sociology at HM Borstal, Dover, then at Monkwearmouth College of Further of Education (merged with Wearside College in 1996 to form the City of Sunderland College) from 1967 to 1971, then from 1971 to 1987 at Jordanhill College of Further Education in Glasgow. He was a councillor on Strathclyde council from 1974 to 1987.

Parliamentary career
In 1979, he tried to win the Labour nomination for the Strathclyde West seat in the European Parliament, but he came third at the selection meeting, behind Valerie Friel and John Carty.

He was Labour Party Member of Parliament (MP) for Clydebank and Milngavie from 1987 until his retirement from Parliament in 2005.

In 2003, he voted against the Iraq War.

He was not replaced as the MP for Clydebank and Milngavie because constituency boundaries in Scotland were redrawn before the 2005 election.  This was to bring the number of MPs per head of population in line with the ratio in England (Scotland had previously been over-represented).

He was awarded an honorary DSc by the University of Greenwich in July 2009.

Personal life
He married Angela May Oliver in 1966, and now has a son (Robert Worthington) and a daughter (Jennifer Warner, née Worthington). As a recent addition to his family, he now has three grandchildren: John Warner, Elizabeth Warner and Nicole Worthington.

References

External links 
 
 His background

1941 births
Living people
People from Lincoln, England
Scottish Labour MPs
UK MPs 1987–1992
UK MPs 1992–1997
UK MPs 1997–2001
UK MPs 2001–2005
Alumni of the University of Glasgow
Alumni of the London School of Economics
Alumni of the University of York
Alumni of Durham University